Nam Il-woo (born August 28, 1981) is a South Korean football player.

Playing career
Nam Il-woo played for J2 League club; Giravanz Kitakyushu in 2013 season.

Club statistics

References

External links

1989 births
Living people
South Korean footballers
J2 League players
Giravanz Kitakyushu players
Association football forwards